A Smile Like Yours is a 1997 American romantic comedy film directed by Keith Samples and starring Greg Kinnear and Lauren Holly.  The film centers on a couple as they try to conceive a child. The film was produced by Rysher Entertainment and released by Paramount Pictures. The title song was performed by Natalie Cole.

Plot 
Danny Robertson and his wife, Jennifer, are happily married, except for one major issue—he is doubtful about having children, and she desperately wants to have a baby. When Jennifer stops using birth control and doesn't tell Danny, it puts a strain on their relationship, particularly after she discovers that they have fertility problems. Soon both Danny and Jennifer are tempted to stray from their marriage as their baby conception woes mount.

Cast
Greg Kinnear as Danny Robertson
Lauren Holly as Jennifer Robertson
Joan Cusack as Nancy Tellen
Jay Thomas as Steve Harris
Jill Hennessy as Lindsay Hamilton
Christopher McDonald as Richard Halstrom
Donald Moffat as Dr. Felber
Shirley MacLaine (uncredited) as Martha

Reception
A Smile Like Yours was generally panned by critics. The site's critical consensus reads: "Flat and unfocused, A Smile Like Yours aims for romantic comedy but settles for tired sitcom formula."

John Hartl of The Seattle Times criticized Samples for his direction and scripting of both his cast and comedic scenes coming across as flat and unfunny, saying that he "systematically takes each comic opportunity and drains the laughs out of it." Lisa Alspector of the Chicago Reader felt that both Kinnear and Holly's characters were written to have charm and display "every clichéd behaviour" about their problems in a film that acts as an "incredibly naive attempt at schmaltz." Dave Kehr, writing for the New York Daily News, said that despite both Kinnear and Hennessy's best efforts with the material given, the film suffers from "witless sex jokes", melodramatic tonal changes and lacking the sweetness found in the comedy Barefoot in the Park. Conversely, Kevin Thomas from the Los Angeles Times gave praise to the cast for their performances and both director Samples and co-writer Meyer for adding wit and "affectionate humor" to the film's infertility plot, despite having an unfulfilling conclusion, calling it "an uncommonly thoughtful and intelligent mainstream entertainment, painstaking and stylish in every aspect." Holly was nominated for a Golden Raspberry Award for Worst Actress for her work in the film and Turbulence, but lost the award to Demi Moore for G.I. Jane.

References

External links

1997 films
1997 directorial debut films
1997 romantic comedy films
1990s English-language films
American romantic comedy films
Films scored by William Ross
Films shot in San Francisco
Paramount Pictures films
Rysher Entertainment films
1990s American films